Top Gun is the soundtrack from the film of the same name, released in 1986 by Columbia Records. 

The album reached number one in the US charts for five nonconsecutive weeks in the summer and autumn of 1986. It was the best selling soundtrack of 1986 and one of the best selling of all time. The song "Take My Breath Away" by Berlin went on to win both the Academy Award for Best Original Song and the Golden Globe Award for Best Original Song. According to Allmusic, the album "remains a quintessential artifact of the mid-'80s", and the album's hits "still define the bombastic, melodramatic sound that dominated the pop charts of the era." 

In 1999, the album was reissued as a "Special Expanded Edition" with additional songs, and in 2006, it was reissued again as Music From and Inspired by Top Gun: Deluxe Edition, containing additional songs not in the film.

Other artists considered
Toto were originally intended to perform the track "Danger Zone", but legal conflicts between the film's producers and the band's lawyers prevented this. Bryan Adams was approached to perform it, but refused any involvement in the film, feeling that it glorified war and, as such, not wanting any of his work linked to it. (Adams also refused to allow his song "Only the Strong Survive" to be featured in the film.) REO Speedwagon were approached but declined, due to not being allowed to contribute any of their own compositions to the soundtrack. Corey Hart also declined, preferring to write and perform his own compositions. Eventually, the film's producers agreed that "Danger Zone" would be recorded and performed by Kenny Loggins.

Members of Toto also wrote and intended to perform a song called "Only You" that would have been used as the film's love theme instead of "Take My Breath Away", but legal conflicts prevented doing so. The Motels were originally considered to perform "Take My Breath Away", and a demo version exists on their 2001 compilation Anthologyland.

Judas Priest were also approached to allow their song "Reckless" in the film but declined when the proposed contract stipulated that the filmmakers have exclusive rights to the song, which would have necessitated the band omitting the song from their forthcoming album Turbo (1986). Former Judas Priest guitarist K.K. Downing later called their opting out of the film "a big mistake". The band offered the producers three other songs for the soundtrack, all of which were rejected.

ABC members Martin Fry and Mark White were invited to see the director's rough cut version of Top Gun in 1986. "They were looking to offer a few British bands soundtrack opportunities. Mark and I weren't impressed with the film and chose not to contribute any music to it."

Bobby Blotzer of Ratt proposed using the song "Reach for the Sky", an outtake from Ratt's 1984 album Out of the Cellar. Although the rest of the band seriously considered the idea, they declined under the belief that their long-time fans would not like the song and would accuse the group of selling out. Although the song title "Reach for the Sky" would become the title of the band's 1988 album, the track itself was never officially released.

The Cars' song "Stranger Eyes" (from their 1984 album Heartbeat City) was featured in an early teaser trailer for the film, though it was absent from the film's final cut.

Track listing

Music from and Inspired by Top Gun: Deluxe Edition
In 2006, the "Special Expanded Edition" was repackaged in the UK with five additional songs "not included in the motion picture".

Charts

Weekly charts

Year-end charts

Certifications

References

Bibliography

 

Soundtrack
1986 soundtrack albums
Action film soundtracks
Columbia Records soundtracks
Drama film soundtracks